Holy Rus or Holy Russia - the Kingdom of Heaven, the eternal tsardom of God in the Heaven and on the Earth, is an important religious and philosophical concept which appeared and developed from the 8th to the 21st centuries by people in East Europe and Central Eurasia.

History 
This religious concept developed through the ages in close connection with Orthodox Russian Christianity, which cannot be understood completely without the idea of Holy Rus.

The idea of Holy Rus can be explained as the idea of Kingdom of Heaven well-known to every Christian around the world, but developed in the realities of society of Central Eurasia under the strong influence of ancient East Slavic Orthodox Christian culture.

The idea made great impact on the emergence and development of many states and societies in East Europe and Central Eurasia through the centuries: the ancient principality of Rus (the Kievan Rus), the Eastern Slavic principalities in the state structure of the Mongol Empire, Empire of the Great Horde, the Russian Czardom and Russian Empire of the 16th to 20th centuries and even on the emergence and development of the Soviet Union which gave birth to the modern Russian, Ukrainian and Belarusian republics:

See also 
Moscow, third Rome
Russian world
Holy Rus (organization)
Kingship and kingdom of God

References

Sources 
 "Holy Russia": A Study in the History of an Idea
 Иконичный образ святости: пространственные, временные, религиозные и историософские категории Святой Руси. part 1

Further reading 
 
 
 Gary Lachman, (2020). The Return of Holy Russia: Apocalyptic History, Mystical Awakening, and the Struggle for the Soul of the World (Inner Traditions).

Christian theology
History of Ruthenia
Russian nationalism
Russian Orthodox Church in Russia